
Year 518 (DXVIII) was a common year starting on Monday (link will display the full calendar) of the Julian calendar. At the time, it was known as the Year of the Consulship of Paulus without colleague (or, less frequently, year 1271 Ab urbe condita). The denomination 518 for this year has been used since the early medieval period, when the Anno Domini calendar era became the prevalent method in Europe for naming years.

Events 
 By place 
 Byzantine Empire 
 July 9 – Emperor Anastasius I dies childless at Constantinople, age 88, after a 27-year reign in which he has abolished the sale of offices, reformed taxation, and perfected the empire's monetary system, but antagonized some with his heretical Monophysite religious policies. He is succeeded by Justin (Flavius Justinus), his comes excubitorum, commander of the palace guard. After his death, he leaves the imperial treasury richer by 23,000,000 solidi or 320,000 pounds of gold.
 Justin I founds the Justinian Dynasty and makes his nephew Flavius Petrus Sabbatius (later Justinian I) his trusted advisor. He becomes the emperor's close confidant and acts possibly as regent. Theocritus, candidate to the throne, is accused of a conspiracy and executed.

 Balkans 
 An earthquake destroys the city of Scupi (present-day Skopje, North Macedonia), in what once was the Roman province of Moesia Superior.

 Arabia 
 Jabalah IV becomes the king of the Ghassanids. He invades Palestine, but is defeated by a Byzantine army under general (dux) Romanus.Shahîd 1989, p. 121, 125–127; Greatrex & Lieu 2002, p. 51

 By topic 

 Religion 
 September 29 – Severus, patriarch of Antioch, is deposed by a synod for his Monophysitism. Paul the Jew is appointed to replace him.

Births 
 Matasuntha, queen of the Ostrogoths (approximate date)
 Mungo, Brythonic apostle and saint (approximate date)
 Yōmei, emperor of Japan (d. 587)

Deaths 
 July 9 – Anastasius I Dicorus, Byzantine emperor
 July – Theocritus, Byzantine pretender 
 Flavian II, patriarch of Antioch
 Gao, Chinese empress of Northern Wei
 Moninne of Killeavy, one of Ireland's early women saints (approximate date)
 Sanghapala, Mon-Khmer monk (b. 506)
 Tonantius Ferreolus, Gallo-Roman senator (approximate date)
 Yu Zhong, official and regent of Northern Wei (b. 452)

References 

Bibliography